Kali Prasad (known as Kalicharan Prasad) is an Indian politician and a member of 17th Legislative Assembly of Deoria, Uttar Pradesh of India. He represents the Salempur constituency of Uttar Pradesh and is a member of the Bhartiya Janata Party.

Early life and education
Prasad was born 6 May 1967 in Devkali, Deoria, Uttar Pradesh to his father Rajman. He married Swarnalata Devi in 1979, they have two sons and two daughters. He belongs to Chamar (Schedule Caste) family. In 1990, he got Graduation degree from Sampurnanand Sanskrit University, Varanasi.

Political career
Peasad has been MLA for one term. Since 2017, he represents Salempur constituency as a member of Bhartiya Janata Party. He defeated Samajwadi Party candidate Vijay Laxmi Gautam by a margin of 25,654 votes.

Posts held

References

Bharatiya Janata Party politicians from Uttar Pradesh
People from Deoria district
Living people
Uttar Pradesh MLAs 2017–2022
1967 births